Dheeraj Kochar, professionally known as Dheeraj Kumar (born 1 October 1944) is an Indian actor, television producer and director. He started Creative Eye Limited, a television production house in 1986. He has acted in both Bollywood and Punjabi films, including Sargam (1979), Roti Kapada Aur Makaan (1974) and Beharoopia (1971).

Career
In 1965, Kumar was one of the finalists in a talent show organized by the United Producers and Filmfare. The other finalists included Subhash Ghai and Rajesh Khanna, Rajesh Khanna was the eventual winner. This helped him launch himself in movies, while simultaneously acting as a model in advertisements including those for Vicks Action 500.

He acted in 21 Punjabi films from 1970 to 1984. He started a production company, Creative Eye and currently serving as the Chairman and Managing Director of the company. In the film Swami (1977), the song "Ka Karoon Sajani, Aaye Na Balam" was picturised on him. He has also worked in other films like Heera Panna, Raaton Ka Raja (where he was the leading man), Shreeman Shrimati etc.

Filmography

 Deedar (1970)
 Raaton Ka Raja (1971)
 Baharon Phool Barsao (1972)
 Heera Panna (1973)
 Sharafat Chod Di Maine (1973)
 Roti Kapda Aur Makan (1975)
 Ranga Khush (1975)
 Angaaray (1976)
 Daaj (1976)
 Fauji (1976) (Punjabi film)
 Udhar ka Sindur (1976)
 Sher Puttar (1977) Punjabi movie
 Swami (1977)
 Shirdi Ke Sai Baba (1977)
Sargam (1979 film)
 Sehti Murad (1979) (Punjabi film)
 Choran Noo Mor (1980) (Punjabi film)
Maang Bharo Sajana (1980)
 Kranti (1981) 
Paanchwin Manzil (1983)
 Purana Mandir (1984) 
 Bepanaah (1985) as Sheshnag
 Karm Yudh (1985) as Kundan
 "Rabb Da Radio" (2017) as Hardeep/Deepa

Television

Director/Producer

 Kahan Gaye Woh Log (1986) (Director)
 Adalat (1986)
 Sansaar (1993)
 Om Namah Shivay (1997)
 Dhoop Chhaon (1999)
 Jap Tap Vratt (2000)
 Shree Ganesh (2000) Channel: Sony
 Sach (2001)
 Jaane Anjaane (2001)
 Paowan (2004) Channel: Hungama TV
 Kya Muhjse Dosti Karoge (2004) Channel: Hungama TV
 Hey...Yehii To Haii Woh! (2004) Channel: Star One
 Om Namo Narayan (2004) Channel: Sahara One
 Bandham
 Ruby Duby Hub Dub (2005) Channel: Sahara One
 Miilee (2006) Channel: Star Plus 
 Jodee Kamal Ki (2006) Channel: Star Plus
 Ghar Ki Lakshmi Betiyann (2006) Channel: Zee TV
 Man Mein Hai Visshwas (2006) Channel: Sony
 Hamari Bhau Tulsi (2007) Channel
 Maayka (2007) Channel: Zee TV
 Waqt Batayega Kaun Apna Kaun Paraya (2008) Channel: Sony
 Jai Ma Vaishanvdevi (2008) Channel: 9x
 Ganesh Leela (2009) Channel: Sahara One
 Yeh Pyar Na Hoga Kam (2009) Channel: Colors
 Rishton Ke Bhanwar Mein Uljhi Niyati (2011) Channel: Sahara One
 Babosa (2011) Channel: Sony
 Sawaare Sabke Sapne Preeto (2011) Channel: Imagine TV
 Neem Neem Shahad Shahad (2011) Channel: Sahara One
 Tujh Sang Preet Lagai Sajna (2012) Channel: Sahara One
 Safar Filmy Comedy Ka. (2013) Channel: Sony Sab
 Nadaniyaan (2013) Channel: Big Magic 
 Singhasan Battisi (2014) Channel: Sony Pal 
 Betaal aur Singhasan Battisi (2015) Channel: Sony Sab 
 Y.A.R.O Ka Tashan (2016) Channel: Sony Sab
 Ishq Subhan Allah (2018) Channel: Zee TV

Web series
 Ishq Aaj Kal (2019)

Television

References

External links
 

Hindi film producers
Living people
Male actors in Hindi cinema
Indian television directors
Indian television producers
Male actors in Punjabi cinema
20th-century Indian male actors
1944 births